Jolanta Prūsienė (born 30 November 1965) is a Lithuanian table tennis player. She is 3 times overall, 9 times singles, 14 times doubles and 7 times mixed doubles Lithuanian champion.

She competed at the 2000 Summer Olympics, reaching the top 16 in doubles competition.

References

External links
 

1965 births
Living people
Lithuanian female table tennis players
Table tennis players at the 2000 Summer Olympics
Olympic table tennis players of Lithuania
Sportspeople from Kaunas